St. Mary's Basilica – officially The Church of the Immaculate Conception of the Blessed Virgin Mary – is a church of the Diocese of Phoenix located at 231 North 3rd Street at the corner of East Monroe Street in downtown Phoenix, Arizona. It was built from 1902 to 1914 in a combination of the Mission Revival and Spanish Colonial Revival styles, and was dedicated in 1915.  It replaced an earlier adobe church built in 1881 when the parish was founded.  The parish has been staffed by the Franciscan Friars since 1895. The current church was elevated to a minor basilica by Pope John Paul II in 1985.

The oldest Catholic parish church in the greater Phoenix area, St. Mary's was the only parish in Phoenix until 1924 and is home to Arizona's largest stained glass windows collection and a 26 rank pipe organ built by the Schantz Organ Company. The building was added to the National Register of Historic Places in 1978 as "St. Mary's Church".

Architecture
The church's Mission Revival–Spanish Colonial Revival structure supports four domes spanning the length of the basilica.  All the domes are compound design with the pendentives, following Roman architecture, transferring the weight of the roof to the pillars.  The dome over the intercept point of the crossover, the nave center aisle and the apse, is topped with stained glass and features a lantern above the dome to emit light into the nave and sanctuary.  The dome located over the altar is topped with a cupola designed to provide light to the altar. The two bell towers are topped with onion shaped domes, typical of the churches of Bavaria and Austria, where Novatus Benzing, the pastor at the time, and Leonard Darscheid, the architectural consultant, both originated. The towers house four bells which ring daily. The renowned Gothic-style stained glass collection was manufactured by the Emil Frei Studio of Missouri. The large upper windows depict scenes from the life of the Blessed Virgin Mary, while the lower nave and transept windows depict images of popular saints of the Franciscan Order and of the heritage of the cultures represented in the community at the time (German, Spanish, Irish). Also noteworthy are the Stations of the Cross by the Andrew Kaletta Studio of St Louis. Rather than simply being painted, they are cast in high relief on a gold background which causes the figures and their detailed features to stand out prominently.

Basilica
Pope John Paul II elevated St. Mary's to the rank of a minor basilica in 1985, two years before his visit to Phoenix in 1987, when he visited St. Mary's and addressed crowds of thousands from the balcony on the facade.  The principal symbols of its status as a basilica – the tintinnabulum (large bell on a column) and the ombrellone (large gold and red umbrella) – are displayed in the sanctuary. St. Mary's became the 32nd basilica in the United States and remains the only basilica in Arizona.  The church, a Phoenix Points of Pride, is located at the northeast corner of North 3rd Street and Monroe in downtown Phoenix, a carillon of the Copper Square.

Clergy and staff
The basilica is staffed by the Franciscan Friars of the Province of Saint Barbara, whose coat of arms and various symbolism can be found displayed prominently throughout the building. The rector is Michael Weldon, and he is assisted by the parochial vicars, Micah Muhlen and Edward Sarrazin. Also in residence are Luis Baldonado and Scott Slattum. Due to the centrality of its location and its historical importance, many of the important liturgical events of the Diocese of Phoenix are split between the basilica and the Cathedral of Saints Simon and Jude, with the Bishop of Phoenix, John P. Dolan as the principal celebrant. On September 13, 2022, the Franciscans announced they would be withdrawing from the basilica, due to falling numbers of clergy and a national change in structure. The future administration of the parish is yet to be determined.

Gallery

See also

 Basilicas in the United States
 List of historic properties in Phoenix, Arizona

References

External links

 St. Mary's Official Website
 Order of Friars Minor Santa Barbara Province Official Website
 Order of Friars Minor Official Website
 The Franciscan Order

Roman Catholic churches in Phoenix, Arizona
Mary
Mary
Phoenix Points of Pride
National Register of Historic Places in Phoenix, Arizona
Churches on the National Register of Historic Places in Arizona
Roman Catholic Ecclesiastical Province of Santa Fe
Mediterranean Revival architecture in the United States
Mission Revival architecture in Arizona
Spanish Colonial Revival architecture in Arizona
1881 establishments in Arizona Territory
Roman Catholic churches completed in 1914
20th-century Roman Catholic church buildings in the United States